Intermediación Aérea was an airline based in Barcelona, Catalonia, Spain. It was established in 1997 and operated domestic passenger and cargo services. It ceased operations in 2005.

Code data
ICAO Code: IEA (not current)

Fleet
Intermediación Aérea used different aircraft along its history. 
2 ATR 42/300
1 Swearingen Merlin II 
1 Learjet 35A

References

External links

Intermediación Aérea aircraft Pictures

Airlines established in 1997
Airlines disestablished in 2005
Defunct airlines of Spain